Helen McKenzie Black  (née Murray; 16 August 1896 – 17 October 1963) was a New Zealand mayoress and community worker. She was born in Aberdeen, Aberdeenshire, Scotland, on 16 August 1896. On 3 December 1924, she married Robert Black, who was mayor of Dunedin from 1929 to 1933.

In the 1952 New Year Honours, Black was appointed a Member of the Order of the British Empire, for social welfare services.

References

External links
Photos of the three female candidates in the 

1896 births
1963 deaths
Scottish social workers
New Zealand social workers
British emigrants to New Zealand
New Zealand Members of the Order of the British Empire
New Zealand Democrat Party (1934) politicians
Unsuccessful candidates in the 1935 New Zealand general election
Unsuccessful candidates in the 1954 New Zealand general election
New Zealand National Party politicians